Norfolk and Suffolk is a district of the Massachusetts Senate. It covers 13.1% of Norfolk County and 9.4% of Suffolk County population in 2010. Democrat Mike Rush of West Roxbury has represented the district since 2011.

In Suffolk County, the district currently encompasses Boston Wd. 18, Pcts. 9, 10, 16-20, 23; Wd. 19, Pcts. 10-13; and Wd. 20.

In Norfolk County, the district currently encompasses Dover, Dedham, Needham Pcts. D-H, Norwood and Westwood.

List of senators

See also
 List of former districts of the Massachusetts Senate
 Norfolk County districts of the Massachusetts House of Representatives: 1st, 2nd, 3rd, 4th, 5th, 6th, 7th, 8th, 9th, 10th, 11th, 12th, 13th, 14th, 15th
 Suffolk County districts of the Massachusetts House of Representatives: 1st, 2nd, 3rd, 4th, 5th, 6th, 7th, 8th, 9th, 10th, 11th, 12th, 13th, 14th, 15th, 16th, 17th, 18th, 19th

References

External links
  (State Senate district information based on U.S. Census Bureau's American Community Survey).
 
 League of Women Voters of Needham
 League of Women Voters of Boston

Senate Norfolk and Suffolk
Government of Norfolk County, Massachusetts
Government of Suffolk County, Massachusetts
Massachusetts Senate